Cumbernauld United Football Club are a football club based in Cumbernauld, North Lanarkshire, Scotland. They play at Guy's Meadow in the Cumbernauld Village area of the town.

Club colours are maroon and blue, and the club's nickname is "United".

The club has a full youth academy with teams from the under-6 age group up to under-19 level. The academy plays its home games on the 'HatTrix' astroturf park adjacent to the Guy's Meadow pitch, as well as on that pitch itself when weather permits.

The Club also has a successful five a side complex and social club.

The team are managed by former Partick Thistle midfielder Andy Frame, who replaced previous manager George Shaw in January 2017.

Guy's Meadow
Guy's Meadow is the home to Cumbernauld United. The stadium currently has a capacity of 2,500 which consists of mainly standing areas.

Facilities
The stadium has few facilities, however the Hat-Trix sports bar lies at one end of the park and two terraced stands are situated at either side of the pitch. The facility also includes an impressive astroturf facility, mainly used to host five-a-side football. The stadium's record attendance was set when 2,200 people watched Cumbernauld play Pollok in 1983.

Kirkintilloch Rob Roy
Since 2014, fellow West of Scotland League club Kirkintilloch Rob Roy have used the stadium as their home venue whilst they search for new home to replace the historic Adamslie Park, where they played for almost 100 years.

Notable former players

Kenny Dalglish: The former Celtic, Liverpool and Scotland International played for Cumbernauld United during season 1967–68.
Lee McCulloch: Motherwell, Wigan, Rangers and Scotland

Honours
Central Region B Division / Overall champions: 1977–78
Central Region A Division / Overall runners-up: 1970–71

References

External links
 Website
 Cumbernauld United - nonleaguescotland.co.uk
 Facebook
 Twitter

 
Cumbernauld
Football clubs in Scotland
Scottish Junior Football Association clubs
Football in North Lanarkshire
Association football clubs established in 1964
1964 establishments in Scotland
West of Scotland Football League teams